Jack Meredith may refer to:
Jack Meredith (footballer) (1899–1970), British footballer
Jack Meredith (athlete) (born 1992), British hurdler
Jack R. Meredith (born 1939), American engineer and management consultant

See also 
 John Meredith (disambiguation)